Carena may refer to:

 Carena, Ticino, a hamlet within the municipality of Sant'Antonio in the Swiss canton of Ticino
 Carena (trademark), a trademark for the drug Aminophylline
 Felice Carena, Italian painter
 Marcela Carena, Argentinian theoretical physicist
 Punta Carena Lighthouse, a lighthouse on the Italian island of Capri